Nenjiang is a town in and the seat of the city of Nenjiang, in northwestern Heilongjiang province, China, bordering Inner Mongolia to the north and west and sitting on the east (left) bank of the Nen River. , it has 12 residential communities and 5 villages under its administration.

See also
List of township-level divisions of Heilongjiang

References

Township-level divisions of Heilongjiang
Heihe